Beatlemania Hamburg was a museum in Hamburg, Germany devoted to the Beatles.

The museum opened in May 2009 conceived as a "Beatles experience".  It was located in the St. Pauli district, near the Beatles-Platz and the Große Freiheit, location of the clubs in which the Beatles played during their formative Hamburg period in the early 1960s.

A large model of a Yellow Submarine hung above the entrance.  The museum itself spanned five floors and contained 11 rooms, each with a different theme.  The history of The Beatles from their Hamburg period to their break-up was displayed through a mixture of original exhibits, interactive features and fan memorabilia, as well as a reconstruction of the Große Freiheit street in 1960s style.

Closing
The museum closed the doors on 30 June 2012 "due to lack of interest".

See also 
 List of music museums

External links
Beatlemania Hamburg

Sources

Museums in Hamburg
Music museums in Germany
Museums established in 2009
2009 establishments in Germany
Buildings and structures in Hamburg-Mitte